This is a list of seasons by the Sta. Lucia Realtors of the Philippine Basketball Association.

Three-conference era

Two-conference era
*one-game playoffs**Team had twice-to-beat advantage

Cumulative records